The 2021 Mid-Season Invitational was the sixth Mid-Season Invitational (MSI), a Riot Games-organised tournament for League of Legends, a multiplayer online battle arena video game. The tournament was the culmination of the 2021 Spring Split and the first international competition of Season 11.

Each of the 12 premier League of Legends leagues had a team representing them. This was the first edition in which all competitive regions began in the same stage of the tournament, unlike previous years where the winners of the minor leagues had to win play-in matches to face teams from the larger regions.

"Starts Right Here" was the tournament's theme song, put together by Foreign Air, and Kenny Mason.

The tournament was hosted in Iceland from 6 to 23 May 2021. All of the matches were held in the Laugardalshöll in Reykjavík due to restrictions from the COVID-19 pandemic. Royal Never Give Up from China defeated the Worlds Champion DWG KIA from South Korea 3–2 in the final, winning their second MSI title.

Format 
The format for 2021 replaces the Play-In stage used from 2017 to 2019 with a Group Stage featuring all regions. The 12 teams were seeded into 3 groups from 4 seeding pools. This is the first time that teams from Europe (LEC), South Korea (LCK) and China (LPL) will not automatically qualify for the second stage (known as the Rumble Stage, formerly the Group Stage of the Main Event) but have to compete with all remaining teams.

The top two teams in each group in Group Stage qualify for the Rumble Stage, a six team double round robin. The top four teams of the Rumble Stage advance to the single elimination Knockout Stage.

The winning team earns their region an additional bid to the 2021 League of Legends World Championship.

Qualified teams 
The number of regions decreased from 13 at MSI 2019 to 12, due to the merger of Taiwan/Hong Kong/Macau (LMS) and Southeast Asian (LST) professional leagues into the PCS for 2020.

Pools of Group Stage are determined by the achievements of regions during the MSI and Worlds events from the two years prior.

Due to national travel restrictions related to COVID-19 in Vietnam, the VCS champions ⁠⁠GAM Esports are unable to participate.

Roster

Venue 
Reykjavík was the city chosen to host the competition. All matches will be played at Laugardalshöll without spectators.

Group stage 
 Date and time: 6–11 May, begins at 13:00 UTC
 Twelve teams are drawn into three groups, with four teams in each group
 Quadruple round robin for Group A, double round robin for Groups B and C; all matches are best-of-one
 If two teams have the same win–loss record and head-to-head record then a tiebreaker match is played
 Top two teams will advance to the Rumble Stage; bottom two teams are eliminated

Group A 
⁠⁠GAM Esports was drawn in this group but unable to participate.

Group B

Group C

Rumble stage 
 Date and time: 14–18 May, begins at 13:00 UTC
 Six teams will play in a double round robin; matches are best-of-one
 If teams have the same win–loss record and head-to-head record, then tiebreaker matches are played for first, second, and fourth place
 Top four teams will advance to the Knockout Stage; bottom two teams are eliminated

Knockout stage 
 1st place team from the Rumble Stage chooses between 3rd and 4th to be their semifinal opponent (DK chose MAD).
 Single elimination, matches are best-of-five

Semifinals

Match 1 

 Date and time: 21 May, 13:00 UTC.

Match 2 

 Date and time: 22 May, 13:00 UTC.

Finals 

 Date and time: 23 May, 13:00 UTC
 The members of the winning team will lift the MSI trophy, earning their title as the League of Legends 2021 Mid-Season Invitational Champions.

Ranking 
(*) Not including tie-break games.

Notes

References 

2021 multiplayer online battle arena tournaments
May 2021 sports events in Europe
2021